Pierluigi Concutelli (3 June 1944 – 15 March 2023) was an Italian neofascist terrorist and bank robber. He styled himself as an "urban guerrilla fighter". He was a member of the far-right organization Ordine Nuovo and later became the leader of its underground armed unit, Gruppi di Azione Ordinovista.

Biography 
On 10 July 1976, Concutelli killed Deputy Prosecutor Vittorio Occorsio in Rome for carrying out investigations of members of underground neofascist circles. He was arrested in 1977. In 2008, together with the RAI journalist Giuseppe Ardica, Concutelli published an autobiography Io, uomo nero.

Concutelli died in Rome on 15 March 2023, at the age of 78.

See also
 Armed, far-right organizations in Italy
 Years of lead

References

Bibliography
 Donatella della Porta, Clandestine Political Violence, Cambridge University Press, pp. 124-131. 

1944 births
2023 deaths
Italian neo-fascists
Years of Lead (Italy)
Politicians from Rome
People convicted on terrorism charges